was a Japanese manga magazine published by Enterbrain and was sold monthly on the twenty-fifth. The name comes from the phrase Magical Cute. The magazine was first published on April 27, 2001, under the title Magi-Cu Premium. It kept that title for three years until 2004, when it was changed to simply Magi-Cu. In June 2007, Magi-Cu published its last issue at volume forty.

Magazine content

Reader participations games
Bottle Fairy
Duel Dolls
Full Throttle Halation!: Hoshi ni Negai wo
Heart Mark!
Koromo Yūgi
Lovely Idol
Neko no Sakaue
Otsukai Blade: Kuro Kishi Monogatari
Rune Princess
Town Memory
Tsungri! Hontō wa Tsundere na Grimm Dōwa
World's end

Manga
5 Kai Bishōjo Kaden Uriba de Gozaimasu
Bad! Daddy
Food Girls
Maoyuu 4-Koma - Muitemasen yo, Maou-sama!
Magi Kyūdō
Kirin Chō Bōei Gumi
Otome wa Boku ni Koishiteru
Petopeto-san
Sukusuku Suisui
Urekko Dōbutsu
Gargoyle of Yoshinaga House

Light novels
Chōmai Taisen Sismagedon
Magician's Academy

External links
Magi-Cu's official website 

2001 establishments in Japan
2007 disestablishments in Japan
Defunct magazines published in Japan
Enterbrain manga
Magazines established in 2001
Magazines disestablished in 2007
Magazines published in Tokyo
Monthly manga magazines published in Japan
Shōnen manga magazines
Seinen manga magazines